Janick is a given name and surname. Notable people with the name include:

Given name
 Janick Gers (born 1957), English musician
 Janick Kamber (born 1992), Swiss footballer
 Janick Klausen (born 1993), Danish high jumper
 Janick Maceta (born 1994), Peruvian model and beauty pageant titleholder

Surname
 John Janick (born 1978), American music entrepreneur